Winslow Upton (October 12, 1853 – January 8, 1914) was an American astronomer. He published extensively on the subject of meteorology.

Biography
He received his undergraduate degree from Brown University and was valedictorian when he graduated in 1875. Upton then worked as an assistant at Mitchel Observatory of the University of Cincinnati where he received his master's degree in 1877. He later received an honorary doctorate from Brown in 1906.

He became an assistant astronomer at the Harvard Observatory in 1877. During this time he wrote a parody of Gilbert and Sullivan's comic opera H.M.S. Pinafore titled Observatory Pinafore. Then he became an assistant engineer for the U. S. Lake Survey from 1879. In 1880 he was a computer at the U.S. Naval Observatory. He was a computer and assistant professor at the U.S. Signal Service in 1881. He was appointed professor and head of the department of astronomy at Brown in 1884. He then became director of Ladd Observatory when it opened in 1891. During his tenure Upton also served as secretary of the faculty and dean at Brown.

He was a member of the U. S. government eclipse expeditions of 1878 and 1883, also of two private expeditions sent out in 1887 and 1889, and in 1896-97 was attached to the southern station of Harvard University at Arequipa, Peru. His systematic research studying meteorology during solar eclipses has been described as "pioneering."

He married Cornelia Augusta Babcock in 1882 and they had two children. Eleanor Stuart Upton was a librarian at the John Carter Brown Library  and Yale University Library. Margaret Frances Upton taught bacteriology. She was also a lab technician and research assistant at hospitals.

Published works
Upton wrote a monthly astronomy column for the Providence Journal for twenty years.

References

Further reading 
 

1853 births
1914 deaths
Brown University alumni
Brown University faculty
American astronomers
Harvard University staff
People from Salem, Massachusetts
Harvard College Observatory people